The 2021 Masters was held October 19 to 24 at the Sixteen Mile Sports Complex in Oakville, Ontario. It was the first Grand Slam and first major of the 2021–22 season.

Qualification
The top 16 ranked men's and women's teams on the World Curling Federation's world team rankings qualified for the event. In the event that a team declines their invitation, the next-ranked team on the world team ranking is invited until the field is complete.

Men
Top world team ranking men's teams:
 Brad Jacobs
 John Epping
 Brad Gushue
 Brendan Bottcher
 Bruce Mouat
 Yannick Schwaller
 Mike McEwen
 Niklas Edin
 Peter de Cruz
 Kevin Koe
 Matt Dunstone
 Ross Paterson
 Jason Gunnlaugson
 Korey Dropkin
 Rich Ruohonen
 Yuta Matsumura
 Ross Whyte

Women
Top world team ranking women's teams:
 Anna Hasselborg
 Kerri Einarson
 Tracy Fleury
 Satsuki Fujisawa
 Jennifer Jones
 Elena Stern
 Silvana Tirinzoni
 Rachel Homan
 Eve Muirhead
 Tabitha Peterson
 Kim Min-ji
 Alina Kovaleva
 Kim Eun-jung
 Sayaka Yoshimura
 Gim Un-chi
 Kelsey Rocque
 Isabella Wranå
 Tori Koana

Men

Teams

The teams are listed as follows:

Knockout brackets

Source:

A event

B event

C event

Knockout results

All draw times are listed in Eastern Time (UTC−04:00).

Draw 3
Tuesday, October 19, 3:00 pm

Draw 4
Tuesday, October 19, 6:30 pm

Draw 7
Wednesday, October 20, 4:00 pm

Draw 8
Wednesday, October 20, 8:00 pm

Draw 10
Thursday, October 21, 11:00 am

Draw 12
Thursday, October 21, 7:00 pm

Draw 13
Friday, October 22, 7:30 am

Draw 14
Friday, October 22, 11:00 am

Draw 16
Friday, October 22, 7:00 pm

Playoffs

Quarterfinals
Saturday, October 23, 12:00 pm

Semifinals
Saturday, October 23, 8:00 pm

Final
Sunday, October 24, 4:00 pm

Women

Teams

The teams are listed as follows:

Knockout brackets

Source:

A event

B event

C event

Knockout results

All draw times are listed in Eastern Time (UTC−04:00).

Draw 1
Tuesday, October 19, 8:00 am

Draw 2
Tuesday, October 19, 11:30 am

Draw 5
Wednesday, October 20, 8:00 am

Draw 6
Wednesday, October 20, 12:00 pm

Draw 9
Thursday, October 21, 7:30 am

Draw 11
Thursday, October 21, 3:00 pm

Draw 13
Friday, October 22, 7:30 am

Draw 15
Friday, October 22, 3:00 pm

Draw 17
Saturday, October 23, 8:00 am

Playoffs

Quarterfinals
Saturday, October 23, 4:00 pm

Semifinals
Saturday, October 23, 8:00 pm

Final
Sunday, October 24, 12:00 pm

Notes

References

External links

October 2021 sports events in Canada
2021 in Canadian curling
Curling in Ontario
2021 in Ontario
2021